The Ned Brown Forest Preserve, popularly known as Busse Woods, adjoining Elk Grove Village and Schaumburg in Illinois, is a  unit of the Cook County Forest Preserve system.  It is named after Edward "Ned" Eagle Brown. A section of the northeast quadrant of the forest preserve is the Busse Forest Nature Preserve, which was registered as a National Natural Landmark in February 1980.  Busse Forest Preserve (Busse Woods) was named for Cook County Commissioner William Busse in 1949.

Biology
Busse Woods, the heart of the forest preserve, is a mature Great Lakes hardwood forest.  A  segment of the woods, the Busse Forest Nature Preserve, is listed as a  national natural landmark as a surviving fragment of flatwoods, a type of damp-ground forest formerly typical of extremely level patches of ground in the Great Lakes region.  Parcels of land with slow rates of precipitation runoff into adjacent wetlands and streams were likely to develop into flatwoods.  A flatwoods forest is characterized by red maple, swamp white oak, and black ash trees.  The black ash trees of Busse Woods are threatened by the emerald ash borer, which was reported in Illinois for the first time in 2006.

Other parts of Busse Woods are better-drained and include species more typical of the forests of northern Illinois, such as the basswood, hickory, sugar maple, and white oak, the latter species being the state tree of Illinois.

Recreation
In contrast to the natural area, the northwest and southwest quadrants of the preserve are dominated by Busse Lake, a  artificial reservoir that serves as a flood-control catchment for Salt Creek and by the tall skyscrapers of eastern Schaumburg.

Stewardship
The Friends of Busse Woods, a non-governmental organization, began operations in 2008.  It cooperates with the Forest Preserve District of Cook County to oversee stewardship partnering operations at Busse Woods.  Partnership operations include invasive species management, trash removal, and native plant reseeding and restocking.  The operations are carried out by volunteer stewards.

See also 
Cook County Forest Preserves
Sauk Trail Woods
North Creek Woods

References

External links

Forest Preserve page
Friends of Busse Woods
Maps of park
 Trail map, showing whole park

Protected areas of Cook County, Illinois
Flora of the Great Lakes region (North America)
Trees of the North-Central United States
Schaumburg, Illinois
Elk Grove Village, Illinois
National Natural Landmarks in Illinois
Forests of Illinois
Nature reserves in Illinois
Trees of the Great Lakes region (North America)